Paranomus tomentosus, the hairy-leaf tree sceptre, is a flower-bearing shrub that belongs to the genus Paranomus and forms part of the fynbos. The plant is native to the Western Cape, South Africa.

Description
The tree blooms from September to November. Fire destroys the plant but the seeds survive. The plant is bisexual and pollinated by insects. The fruit ripens two months after flowering, and the seeds fall to the ground where they are spread by ants.

The shrub's national number is 72.5.

Distribution and habitat
The plant occurs in the Cederberg Mountains.

Gallery

References

External links

tomentosus
Taxa named by N. E. Brown
Taxa named by Edwin Percy Phillips
Taxa named by John Hutchinson (botanist)